Davidina  is a genus of butterflies in the family Nymphalidae (subfamily Satyrinae). They occur in northeast and central China.

Species
Species include:
Davidina armandi Oberthür, 1879 (northeast China: Shansi)
Davidina alticola Röber, [1907] (central China: Shensi)

References

External links
Images representing Davidina at Consortium for the Barcode of Life

Satyrinae
Butterfly genera
Taxa named by Charles Oberthür